Drupella is a genus of sea snails, marine gastropod mollusks in the family Muricidae, the murex snails or rock snails.

This genus was placed in the family Muricidae by Drivas & Jay, 1988 and by Richmond, 1997.

Description 
Drupella can be recognised by their extremely long, thin lateral teeth. The shells and radulae vary considerably even within species, complicating the taxonomy of the genus. The colour of the shell aperture varies from white to purple. Some species show sexual dimorphism in their radulae, with males having larger rachidian teeth than females.

Diet 
Snails of this genus are specialist predators of coral polyps.

Species
Species within the genus Drupella include:
 Drupella cornus (Röding, 1798)
 Drupella eburnea (Küster, 1862)
 Drupella fragum (Blainville, 1832)
 Drupella minuta Fujioka, 1984
 Drupella rugosa (Born, 1778)
 Drupella margariticola
 Species brought into synonymy 
 Drupella cariosa Wood: synonym of Muricodrupa fenestrata (Blainville, 1832)
 Drupella fraga (Blainville, 1832) accepted as Drupella fragum (Blainville, 1832) 
 Drupella ochrostoma (Blainville, 1832): synonym of Pascula ochrostoma (Blainville, 1832)

References

 Taylor, J.D. (1973). Provisional list of the mollusca of Aldabra Atoll

External links

 
Ergalataxinae